Jean-Nicolas Lemmens (also Joannes Nicolaas Lemmens or Joannes Nicolaus Lemmens) (3 June 1850, in Schimmert – 10 August 1897, in Cobán (Guatemala)) was a Dutch Catholic priest and Bishop of Victoria, Vancouver Island, Canada. He was a strong supporter of the  British Columbian organised labour movement.

Family
Jean-Nicolas Lemmens was born the son of Godfried Lemmens and Gertrude Bemelmans, within a large Dutch Roman Catholic, family originating from the Beek-Schimmert area in the southern Netherlands.

His family produced a number of Catholic priests, including his brother, Hendrik Lemmens, also a priest in Victoria, Canada, and Guillaume Lemmens (1884-1960), Bishop of Roermond in the Netherlands.

Career
Lemmens studied at the American College in Leuven, Belgium, which was founded in 1857. He then moved, with his brother, to Vancouver Island, Canada.

After the murder of Monseigneur Seghers in 1888 he was appointed Bishop of Victoria. He laid the foundation stone of St. Andrew's Cathedral in 1890, which can still be seen near the side entrance. On 30 October 1892 he consecrated the Cathedral.

During the early 1890s, Lemmens actively encouraged local Catholics to join labour organisations (including the forerunner to the British Columbia Federation of Labour which had been established in 1890) and to unite with other citizens to press, "for better working conditions". He is considered as one of the earliest supporters of organised labour in British Columbia.

Lemmens travelled to Guatemala in June, July and August 1897 owing to the "prolonged exile" of local Archbishop Casanova. During his travels he often wrote detailed letters to his parents in the Netherlands. While there he confirmed 15,000 local Catholics. However, he contracted dysentery and died on 10 August.

References

 J.N. Lemmens. Repertorium van Nederlandse zendings- en missie-archieven 1800-1960

19th-century Roman Catholic bishops in Canada
1850 births
1897 deaths
Deaths from dysentery
Dutch emigrants to Canada
Roman Catholic bishops of Victoria in Canada
People from Schimmert